The 1975 New York City Marathon was the 6th edition of the New York City Marathon and took place in New York City on 6 September.

Results

Men

Women

References

External links

New York City Marathon, 1975
Marathon
New York City Marathon
New York City